Echinophoria coronadoi is a species of large sea snail, a marine gastropod mollusk in the family Cassidae, the helmet snails and bonnet snails.

Distribution
This species occurs in the Caribbean Sea and the Gulf of Mexico.

Description 
The maximum recorded shell length is 120.8 mm.

Habitat 
Minimum recorded depth is 33 m. Maximum recorded depth is 275 m.

References

 Beu A.G. (2008) Recent deep-water Cassidae of the world. A revision of Galeodea, Oocorys, Sconsia, Echinophoria and related taxa, with new genera and species (Mollusca, Gastropoda). In Héros V., Cowie R.H. & Bouchet P. (eds), Tropical Deep-Sea Benthos 25. Mémoires du Muséum National d'Histoire Naturelle 196: 269-387. page(s): 369
 Rosenberg, G., F. Moretzsohn, and E. F. García. 2009. Gastropoda (Mollusca) of the Gulf of Mexico, Pp. 579–699 in Felder, D.L. and D.K. Camp (eds.), Gulf of Mexico–Origins, Waters, and Biota. Biodiversity. Texas A&M Press, College Station, Texas. [

External links

Cassidae
Gastropods described in 1867